Lord Hay may refer to:

Earl of Erroll, a title in the Peerage of Scotland
Marquess of Tweeddale, a title of the Peerage of Scotland
James Hay, Lord Hay, British Army officer
Willie Hay, Baron Hay of Ballyore (born 1950), Northern Irish politician